Ore Mountains may refer to:

 The Ore Mountains of Central Europe in Germany, and the Czech Republic (German: Erzgebirge, Czech: Krušné hory)
 the Serbian Ore Mountains, the southwestern foothills of the Carpathians
 The Slovak Ore Mountains, in western Slovakia
 The Transylvanian Ore Mountains (Romanian: Munţii Metaliferi), in Romania, part of the Apuseni Mountains 

nl:Erzgebirge